Shampa Reza is a Bangladeshi singer, model and actress.

Early life
Reza started singing at the age of four. She studied in Holy Cross School, Dhaka. She went to Shantiniketan to study in Visva-Bharati University in 1976. Her instructor was Guru Pandit Druvu Tara Joshi.

Career 
In 1975, when she was in grade 10, her acting career began with a role in the play Ostrotogandha, directed by Selim Al Deen. She got her breakthrough by acting in the TV drama Idiot. She acted in the 2016 movie Rina Brown based on Bangladesh Liberation war. Reza acted in the movie Guerilla, released in 2011. In January 2015 she was declared a Showbiz Fashion Icon by The Daily Star. Reza has also completed a Bangla action thriller Before I Die, a late 2022 release.

Personal life
Reza has two sons – Dhrubo and Tiash.  She also has a granddaughter.

She is the founder of the schools Anando Niketan and Rodela Chottor.

References

External links
 
 
 

20th-century Bangladeshi actresses
Living people
Bengali television actresses
Year of birth missing (living people)
Place of birth missing (living people)
Visva-Bharati University alumni
Bangladeshi television actresses
Bangladeshi female models
Bangladeshi film actresses
Best Supporting Actress Bachsas Award winners